The Wilson quotient W(p) is defined as:

If p is a prime number, the quotient is an integer by Wilson's theorem; moreover, if p is composite, the quotient is not an integer. If p divides W(p), it is called a Wilson prime. The integer values of W(p) are :

 W(2) = 1
 W(3) = 1
 W(5) = 5
 W(7) = 103
 W(11) = 329891
 W(13) = 36846277
 W(17) = 1230752346353
 W(19) = 336967037143579
 ...

It is known that

where  is the k-th Bernoulli number.

See also 
 Fermat quotient

References

External links 
 MathWorld: Wilson Quotient

Integer sequences